Amber Chia (pinyin: Xiè Lìpíng; born 14 December 1981) is a Malaysian model, actress, TV host and brand ambassador. She was born in Teluk Intan, Malaysia but grew up in the town of Tawau in Sabah, East Malaysia. Chia started her own company Amber Creations in mid-2009 and a modelling school Amber Chia Academy in August 2010.

Early life
Chia was born in Teluk Intan, Perak. Due to her parents hardship, she was taken care by foster parents at eight years old. When she turned 12, Chia moved back to Tawau, Sabah. She stopped schooling at 15, to work full-time in order to help her family. In an interview with iMoney.my, Chia worked three jobs; selling fish at the market in the morning, salesgirl at a small mall in the day and a cashier at a pub at night.

Career
Winner of the Guess Watches Timeless Beauty International Model Search 2004 title, Chia became the first Asian model to campaign for Guess Watches worldwide.  Victoria Beckham selected her to present the Victoria Beckham Autumn/Winter 2009 Ready to Wear Collection during the  New York Fashion Week.

Personal life
She married her business partner manager Adrian Wong in March 2010. Wong is the founder and director of CMG Absolute and has two children from a previous marriage. The couple has a son named Ashton Wong; born September 2010. Ashton Wong is a child model.

References

External links 

 
 
 

1981 births
Living people
Malaysian actresses
Malaysian female models
Malaysian people of Chinese descent
Malaysian socialites
People from Ipoh
People from Sabah
People from Perak